Henry Sinclair may refer to:

 Henry I Sinclair, Earl of Orkney (1345–1400), Norwegian nobleman
 Henry II Sinclair, Earl of Orkney (c. 1375–1422), Norwegian nobleman
 Henry Harbison Sinclair (1848-1914), businessman of California
 Henry Sinclair, 2nd Baron Pentland (1907–1984), Scottish peer
 Henry Sinclair (bishop) (1508–1565), lord-president of the court of session and bishop of Ross
 Henry Daniel Sinclair (1818–1868), explorer and founder of Bowen, Queensland, Australia

See also
Harry Sinclair (disambiguation)